Milk & Honey (in Hebrew: חלב ודבש) (sometimes referred to as M&H) is Israel's first single malt whisky distillery.

It began operating in 2014 in the south of Tel Aviv. Besides manufacturing, there’s also a visitor center, where visitors can learn more about the distilling process and enjoy whisky tastings.

All of the distillery’s products are Kosher.

History 

The plans for the distillery began in 2012, after a group of entrepreneurs: Gal Kalkshtein, the owner of the distillery, along with Amit Dror, Simon Fried and Roee and Naama Licht decided to establish the first whisky distillery in Israel.
Since its establishment, the distillery's operations were accompanied by Dr. James Swan, world-renowned whisky expert, until he died in February 2017.

Since the distillery's founding, the Head Distiller has been Tomer Goren.

The distillery's first products reached the shelves during the first quarter of 2016. In May 2017, the distillery unveiled Israel's first ever single-malt whisky, made by its Head Distiller, Tomer Goren. Their whiskey, aged for more than 3 years, has been noted to be well-matured due to Israel's warm climate affecting and accelerating the aging process.

The distillery's name is a reference to the biblical phrase "The Land of Milk and Honey".

Gallery

See also

References 
This article is based upon a translation of the Hebrew language version as of September 2017.

External links 
 The Milk & Honey Distillery – official site

Distilleries of Asia
Drink companies of Israel
Malt whisky
Manufacturing companies based in Tel Aviv